Christopher Anthony Corner (born 23 January 1974) better known as Chris Corner is an English record producer, songwriter, multi-instrumentalist, singer and video artist. He was a founding member of the band Sneaker Pimps alongside Liam Howe, and is now active with his solo project IAMX.

Born and raised in Middlesbrough, Corner moved to London in the mid-90s to pursue his education at Goldsmith's, University of London then at Queen Mary University before changing his focus to creating music full time. After Sneaker Pimps went on hiatus, he moved from London to Berlin in 2006, where he set up an IAMX studio for music and visual work until 2014.

However, after battling chronic insomnia and depression, IAMX left Berlin and moved to California, later stating: "I needed a big change of scenery. I had a few friends in Los Angeles and it seemed like the most relevant place for me, so I got on a boat and sailed over to the States." He now lives in a remote location in Southern California.

To date, Chris Corner has released thirteen studio albums, four with Sneaker Pimps – Becoming X (1996), Splinter (1999), Bloodsport (2002) and Squaring the Circle (2021) and nine as IAMX – Kiss and Swallow (2004), The Alternative (2006), Kingdom of Welcome Addiction (2009), Volatile Times (2011), The Unified Field, (2013) Metanoia (2015), Everything Is Burning (2016), and Alive in New Light (2018) and an acoustic rework album – Echo Echo (2020). As well as two experimental albums – Unfall (2017) and Machinate (2021) and two live albums – Live in Warsaw (2008) and Mile Deep Hollow Tour (2022). All albums under the IAMX moniker have been released independently and were written and produced solely by Corner with the exception of the fifth studio album The Unified Field, which was co-produced by Jim Abbiss, the experimental album Unfall which also features co-production and co-writing by Abbiss, and the acoustic album Echo Echo, which was co-produced by David Bottrill. Two more studio albums have been announced for release in the Spring and Fall of 2023.

Corner also composed and produced the soundtrack for the film Les Chevaliers du Ciel (2005). Which included features from Sue Denim of Robots In Disguise and the band Placebo. Further, many of Corner's songs have appeared in films, TV productions, and in video games. Most notably The Saint (1997), Queer As Folk (2001), Hostel (2005), Grand Theft Auto V (2013), and How To Get Away With Murder (2014) with the later featuring Corner's music in 16 different episodes across the show's six seasons.

He has also directed, filmed, and edited music videos both for his own projects IAMX and Sneaker Pimps, and for other musicians such as Gary Numan.

UNFALL Productions

UNFALL (formerly creating under the name Orphic) was founded in 2021 by Chris Corner and Janine Gezang to be a service for fiercely independent musicians.

UNFALL is a record label, music video production company, and music photography service.

References

External links
 Official IAMX Website
 Official IAMX Bandcamp
 IAMX Blog
 IAMX Webstore
 Sneaker Pimps Legacy

1974 births
Place of birth missing (living people)
Living people
People educated at Mill Hill School
Alumni of Goldsmiths, University of London
British indie rock musicians
British trip hop musicians
English electronic musicians
English male singer-songwriters
English record producers
People from Middlesbrough
21st-century English singers
21st-century British male singers